Zeferino Antunes Flores is a Mexican politician from the Party of the Democratic Revolution. From 2002 to 2003 he served as Deputy of the LVIII Legislature of the Mexican Congress representing the State of Mexico.

References

Date of birth unknown
Living people
Politicians from the State of Mexico
Party of the Democratic Revolution politicians
21st-century Mexican politicians
Year of birth missing (living people)
Deputies of the LVIII Legislature of Mexico
Members of the Chamber of Deputies (Mexico) for the State of Mexico